The Zotye Z100 is a City car hatchback produced by Zotye Auto. The model is available as a gasoline powered vehicle and as an electric vehicle. The Z100 was discontinued in 2017, while the electric version was relaunched in 2017 as the Zotye Cloud 100.

Overview
Originally launched as the new Jiangnan TT in prototype form, the production version was renamed to Zotye Z100 to fit into the refreshed Zotye product line. 

The Zotye Z100 debuted during the 2012 Shanghai Auto Show, and was launched in the Chinese market since September 2013, replacing the Jiangnan TT, which was based on the Suzuki Alto CA71 sold from 1988 to 2013 in China.

Powertrain
The only engine choice for the Z100 is a 1.0 litre 3 cylinder engine with 56hp known as the TNN3G10K. Gearbox options are a 5 speed manual transmission or a 4-speed automatic transmission.

Zotye Cloud 100
The Zotye Cloud 100 is the successor of the Zotye Z100 EV and was first introduced in 2017, with updated versions launched in 2018. The company started taking orders for the car in January 2015. The original version had 5 doors, 5 seats, front-wheel drive, and a 22 kWh battery that gives 125 mile range, 64 mph top speed, and 36 horsepower.

The 2018 model year is offered in 2 additional versions, mainly changing the comfort trim models: short range and long range. The short range model had a 194 mile range and 60 horsepower, while the long range produces the same power, but with a more premium cabin. Both versions take 8 hours to charge, have dimensions of 3627 mm/1620 mm/1476 mm, a wheelbase of 2360 mm, kerb weight of 1040 kg, and a cost of ¥72,800 in China.

From 2019 to present, sales have dropped in China, and in efforts to reboot sales, the Cloud 100 was exported to Pakistan in 2021. Its main competitor there is the MG ZS. It is also planned to be brought to Russia.

The Zotye Z100 was discontinued after a short run, but the electric versions including the Zotye Cloud 100Plus and Zotye Cloud 100S continued to be sold.

Design controversies
Despite the styling of the Zotye Z100 being very similar to the Suzuki Alto, and the predecessor, Jiangnan TT being a licensed rebadge version of the Suzuki Alto, the Zotye Z100 has nothing to do with Suzuki, but rather a car with styling heavily inspired by the Suzuki Alto.

Sales (China)

References

External links

 Zotye Cloud 100Plus 
 Zotye Cloud 100S 

Z100
Front-wheel-drive vehicles
Cars introduced in 2013
Hatchbacks
Subcompact cars
City cars
Production electric cars
Cars of China